A technical time-out in volleyball and beach volleyball is a time-out stipulated by the Fédération Internationale de Volleyball (FIVB) in each non-tie-breaking set. It is the formalized equivalent of a television timeout in other sports:

Beach volleyball
 30-second duration
 one technical time-out in each of sets 1 and 2 (none in the third tie-breaking set)
 taken when the combined teams' scores equals 21

Volleyball
 60-second duration
 two technical time-outs in each of sets 1, 2, 3 and 4 (none in the fifth tie-breaking set)
 taken when the leading team reaches the 8th and 16th points

References 

Volleyball terminology
Sports rules and regulations
Sports terminology
Sports television